is a former Japanese football player.

Club statistics

References

External links

1980 births
Living people
University of Tsukuba alumni
Association football people from Kanagawa Prefecture
Japanese footballers
J1 League players
J2 League players
Ventforet Kofu players
Vissel Kobe players
Association football goalkeepers